Acrolophus serratus is a moth of the family Acrolophidae. It was described by Hasbrouck in 1964. It is found in North America.

References

Moths described in 1964
serratus